Montgomery Public Schools is a school district headquartered in Montgomery, Alabama, United States. The current Superintendent of Montgomery Public Schools is Melvin Brown. The district serves the city of Montgomery and surrounding Montgomery County.  It is the third largest district in Alabama, with 31,743 students enrolled. The entire district is accredited by AdvancED and also has two International Baccalaureate programs: Macmillan International Academy (Elementary) and Johnnie Carr Middle School.

The district serves most of Montgomery County, except for Pike Road (see Pike Road Schools) and, for PreKindergarten-Grade 8, Maxwell Air Force Base. For high school Maxwell AFB residents are zoned to Montgomery Public Schools facilities.

History
In the mid-1910s the county operated forty-seven schools for 3,020 White children. These schools were funded by the county and had only enough desks for about a third of the students. Combined, these schools had a value about half that of the county jail.

In 2014 four Montgomery Public School high schools made it onto the U.S. News & World Report best high schools list, the most of any system in the state, with LAMP High School being named both the best high school in the state and among the top 20 high schools in the nation. Two other MPS schools (BTW Magnet High School and Brewbaker Technology Magnet High School) were named in the top ten best Alabama high schools list, and George Washington Carver High School was also recognized as a top high school on the list.

In 2017 the state took over a number of failing schools in the system. In April 2017, it was reported that the principals of the 27 failing schools were to receive ten-percent salary increases and three-year contract extensions.

On August 18, 2018, one of the three buildings that make up the campus of Booker T. Washington Magnet High School burned down. The 411 students from BTW will be moved to the (currently closed) Hayneville Road Elementary School.

Schools

High schools
Booker T. Washington Magnet High School
Brewbaker Technology Magnet High School
Carver High School
Jefferson Davis High School
Lanier High School
Loveless Academic Magnet Program High School
McIntrye Comprehensive Academy
Montgomery Preparatory Academy for Career Technologies
Park Crossing High School
Robert E. Lee High School
Goodwyn Middle School

Elementary schools
Bear Exploration Center School
Blount Elementary School
Brewbaker Intermediate School/Brewbaker Primary School
Carver Elementary and Arts Magnet School
Catoma Elementary School
Chisholm Elementary School
Crump Elementary School
Dalraida Elementary School
Dannelly Elementary School
Davis Elementary School
Dozier Elementary School
Dunbar-Ramer School, Ramer (K-8)
Fitzpatrick Elementary School
Flowers Elementary School
Forest Avenue Academic Magnet School
Garrett Elementary School
Halcyon Elementary School
Highland Avenue Elementary School
Highland Gardens Elementary School
Johnson Elementary School
MacMillan International Academy for Humanities, Communications & Technology
Martin Luther King Elementary School
Morningview Elementary School
Morris Elementary School
Nixon Elementary School
Pintlala Elementary School, Pintlala
Southlawn Elementary School
Vaughn Road Elementary School
Wares Ferry Elementary School
Wilson Elementary School

Failing schools
Statewide testing ranks the schools in Alabama. Those in the bottom six percent are listed as "failing." As of early 2018, eleven local schools were included in this category:
 Bellingrath Middle School
 Capitol Heights Middle School
 Carver Senior High School
 Davis Elementary School
 Fews Secondary Acceleration Academy
 Highland Avenue Elementary School
 Jefferson Davis High School
 Lanier Senior High School
 Lee High School
 E.D. Nixon Elementary School
 Wares Ferry Elementary School
 Park Crossing High School

See also

Education in Alabama

References

External links

 Official website

School districts in Alabama
Education in Montgomery County, Alabama
Education in Montgomery, Alabama